Jan Gan or Jangan may refer to:
 Jangan, Ardabil
 Jan Gan, Hormozgan